Helen Thomas (1920-2013) was an American journalist. 

Helen Thomas could also refer to: 

Helen L. Thomas (1905–1997), American historian and scientist
Helen Thomas (activist) (1966–1989), Welsh peace activist
Helen Thomas Dranga (1866–1927), British-American painter